The Adler House is a historic house located at 292 Boswell Street in Batesville, Arkansas.

Description and history 
It is a -story structure, built out of coursed rubble limestone, material also used in the chimney and porch piers. It has a cross-gable roof configuration, with the front gable decorated with applied half-timbering over stucco.  Below and left of the gable is the entry porch, also with a gabled roof. The house was designed by Theodore Sanders and built c. 1915. It is a high quality local example of Craftsman architecture.

The house was listed on the National Register of Historic Places on December 22, 1982.

See also
National Register of Historic Places listings in Independence County, Arkansas

References

Houses on the National Register of Historic Places in Arkansas
Houses completed in 1915
Houses in Batesville, Arkansas
National Register of Historic Places in Independence County, Arkansas
American Craftsman architecture in Arkansas
Bungalow architecture in Arkansas
1915 establishments in Arkansas